The Yunnan clique was one of several mutually hostile cliques or factions that split from the Beiyang Government in the Republic of China's warlord era.  It was named for Yunnan Province.

History

Kunming Uprising 
When the 1911 Revolution began, Cai E, the commander of the 37th Brigade of the New Army, revolted against the Qing government and quickly gained control over Yunnan. The local Qing administration was replaced with an independent government and educational reforms were enacted by Cai. He also reorganised the provincial military into a more cohesive independent force. In the following six months, all of Yunnan and southern Sichuan were unified under the clique's rule. Cai E was very popular among people because he denounced factionalism and supported a strong central government.

In 1913, Cai E went to serve in Yuan's government in Beijing, leaving behind Tang Jiyao as provincial governor. Jiyao came from a prominent Yunnanese family. That same year the Yunnan provincial police department established the provincial public health office. In December 1915, Yuan Shikai announced his plan to turn China back into a monarchy with himself as emperor. This enraged Cai, who was a supporter of the Republic. Shortly after the announcement, Cai E secretly left Beijing and returned to Yunnan to stage a revolt.

Independence 
On December 25, Cai E, Tang Jiyao, and Li Liejun, on the advice of Liang Qichao, declared Yunnan independent and expressed their opposition to Yuan Shikai's monarchy. Tang would stay as governor, but Cai and Li would assume command of the Nation Protection Army. On January 1, 1916, Yunnan published an official denunciation of Yuan Shikai's monarchy. The same day, three divisions of the National Protection Army marched onto Sichuan, Guizhou, and Guangxi, beginning the National Protection War to restore the republic.

After being informed of Yunnan's declaration of independence, Yuan immediately sent out three armies to crush the rebellion but suffered heavy losses in southern Sichuan by Cai's forces. After several campaigns in the province, it fell under Cai's rule, who became its governor till his death. In the following two months, other provinces declared independence and joined Yunnan in its fight against Yuan. By June, Yuan had been defeated and was replaced by Li Yuanhong as president of the republic.

The National Protection War made Cai a national hero, but he died shortly after from tuberculosis. His chief lieutenant, Tang Jiyao, took over Yunnan and demanded that the National Assembly be restored. When this was accomplished, Yunnan officially reunified with the national government but kept its provincial army separate due to the Beiyang Army's grip on Beijing politics.

Rival government 
After the second dissolution of the National Assembly, the Manchu Restoration debacle, and the complete domination of the central government by the Beiyang generals, Yunnan joined several other southern provinces in forming a rival government in Guangzhou during the Constitutional Protection Movement.  Tang Jiyao was chosen as one of the seven executives of its ruling committee.  Within the committee, there was a power struggle between Sun Yatsen's supporters and the Old Guangxi clique.  Tang sided with Sun and helped in the expulsion of the Guangxi executives.  In 1921, he was ousted by Gu Pinzhen, whose rule was recognized by Sun.  The following year, Gu's army defected back to Tang.  Tang sided with Sun again during Chen Jiongming's betrayal.  Less than a week after Sun died in 1925, Tang claimed to be his rightful successor and made a move on Guangzhou in a bid to overthrow Hu Hanmin and put himself in charge of the Kuomintang.  His forces were routed by Li Zongren during the Yunnan-Guangxi War.  Thereafter, Tang joined Chen Jiongming's China Public Interest Party as its vice premier.  In 1927, Long Yun seized control of the clique; Tang died shortly after.

Long Yun's rule 
Long then re-aligned Yunnan under the Nationalist government in Nanjing but stringently guarded the province's autonomy.  Long was a critic of Chiang Kai-shek and after the end of the Second Sino-Japanese War, he was removed from office.

International Relations 
Due to its proximity to French Indochina, Yunnan's main supplier of arms came from France. Yunnan tried to buy aircraft from the British but was denied because of an arms embargo agreement. Tang also bought German machines, lathes, and planning tools for his arsenal but decided to go no further. In 1920, Tang bought 7,000 rifles and 20 machine guns from French merchants.

Airforce 
In October 1922, Tongking-based firm, Poinsard et Veyret, sold Tang six Bréguet 14 airplanes and 12 Yunnanese students went to Tongking to receive flight training.

See also 
 Warlord Era
 List of warlords and military cliques in the Warlord Era

References

Works Cited
 
 
 
 

1915 establishments in China
1927 disestablishments in China
Warlord cliques in Republican China
History of Yunnan
Former republics